The Knole Academy is a secondary school in Sevenoaks, Kent, England that was opened in September 2010, as a result of the amalgamation of the Wildernesse School (for boys) and Bradbourne School (for girls).

The site
The former Bradbourne site was selected for the new academy. This had to be a sensitive development as the site lies right at the edge of the metropolitan Green Belt.
The  location  of  the  new  building  was  selected  to respect  the  overall  use  pattern  of the site, and to enable  construction   whilst the existing buildings remained in use.

To the north of the three-storey new building are two sports halls and the music teaching accommodation. To the south set at an angle that follows the contours of the site are the specialist classrooms, toilets and office space. Art has the top floor, science has the middle floor and construction and technology on the ground floor. General classrooms are in the existing building.

The sites of the previous schools were used during the construction of the new Academy buildings which weren't completed until 2015. On merger, not all of the students from Wildernesse moved over immediately; the merger of students was only completed in September 2011. Since then, the site at Knole East (Wildernesse) has been used to site Trinity Free School, Sevenoaks and Weald of Kent Grammar School Annex.

Academics
The school is currently rated 'Good'.

Previous schools
The Wildernesse School was a single sex high School for boys aged eleven to nineteen. It had Specialist School status for Mathematics and Computing.  Other than the English motto taken from a letter to Sir Philip Sidney from his father, the school had a Latin motto: Non Nobis Solum (English: "Not for ourselves alone").
The school closed in July 2010, becoming part of the Knole Academy at the start of the autumn term in September 2010.

The Bradbourne School was a girls 11–18, high school with a 6th form that hosted about 860 students. It closed in 2010.

Former pupils
 From Wildernesse
 Anton du Beke, choreographer
 Jerome Flynn, actor and singer
 Murray Lachlan Young, broadcaster
 John Salako, footballer
 Matthew Wilson, garden designer and broadcaster

References

External links

 

Secondary schools in Kent
Academies in Kent
Schools in Sevenoaks